Union County Courthouse is a historic courthouse building located at Monroe, Union County, North Carolina.  The original Late Victorian section, was built in 1886, consisted of a two-story five-bay main block with a two-bay wing on each side.  It has a low hip roof surmounted by a large cupola.  Two additional
three-bay wings were added in 1922.

It was listed on the National Register of Historic Places in 1971.  It is located in the Monroe Downtown Historic District.

References

County courthouses in North Carolina
Courthouses on the National Register of Historic Places in North Carolina
Victorian architecture in North Carolina
Government buildings completed in 1886
Buildings and structures in Union County, North Carolina
National Register of Historic Places in Union County, North Carolina
Historic district contributing properties in North Carolina